Samuel Schwartz (July 1, 1882 – June 29, 1943) was an American racewalker. He competed in the 10 km walk at the 1912 Summer Olympics.

References

1882 births
1943 deaths
American male racewalkers
Olympic track and field athletes of the United States
Athletes (track and field) at the 1912 Summer Olympics